Dirk Werner (born 25 May 1981 in Hannover, Lower Saxony)  is a German Porsche factory racing driver.

Born in Hannover, Werner was 2007  and 2009 Grand-Am Rolex Sports Car Series champion for Farnbacher-Loles Racing driving a Porsche 911 and finished third in the GT Class in the 2011 American Le Mans Series season.  Werner has scored podiums various high level endurance races, including the 24 Hours of Daytona, 24 Hours of Spa, 24 Hours of Nürburgring, 12 Hours of Sebring and Petit Le Mans.

Since 2010, Werner is a BMW works driver, and has competed at the 24 Hours of Le Mans, the Le Mans Series and the Intercontinental Le Mans Cup in addition to the American Le Mans Series.

In 2012, he would become one of the six BMW drivers in its return to the Deutsche Tourenwagen Masters after two decades of absence.

Racing record

Complete Porsche Supercup results
(key) (Races in bold indicate pole position) (Races in italics indicate fastest lap)

† — Did not finish the race but was classified as he completed over 90% of the race distance.

‡ Not eligible for points

24 Hours of Daytona results

Britcar 24 Hour results

24 Hours of Le Mans results

Complete DTM results
(key) (Races in bold indicate pole position) (Races in italics indicate fastest lap)

Complete FIA World Endurance Championship results

Complete WeatherTech SportsCar Championship results
(key) (Races in bold indicate pole position; results in italics indicate fastest lap)

References

External links

  
 

1981 births
Living people
Sportspeople from Hanover
Racing drivers from Lower Saxony
German racing drivers
24 Hours of Daytona drivers
Rolex Sports Car Series drivers
Porsche Supercup drivers
Deutsche Tourenwagen Masters drivers
Blancpain Endurance Series drivers
WeatherTech SportsCar Championship drivers
24 Hours of Spa drivers
Britcar 24-hour drivers
24H Series drivers
GT World Challenge America drivers
Porsche Motorsports drivers
Schnitzer Motorsport drivers
BMW M drivers
Rahal Letterman Lanigan Racing drivers
Rowe Racing drivers
Nürburgring 24 Hours drivers
Porsche Carrera Cup Germany drivers